The 2022 Futsal Finalissima was the first edition of the Futsal Finalissima, an international futsal championship organised by UEFA and CONMEBOL. It took place at the Estadio Mary Terán de Weiss in Buenos Aires, Argentina, between 15 and 18 September 2022.

Background
On 12 February 2020, UEFA and CONMEBOL signed a renewed memorandum of understanding meant to enhance cooperation between the two organisations. As part of the agreement, a joint UEFA–CONMEBOL committee examined the possibility of staging European–South American intercontinental matches, for both men's and women's football and across various age groups. On 15 December 2021, UEFA and CONMEBOL again signed a renewed memorandum of understanding lasting until 2028, which included specific provisions on opening a joint office in London and the potential organisation of various football events.

On 2 June 2022, the day after staging the 2022 Finalissima, CONMEBOL and UEFA announced a series of new events between teams from the two confederations. This included a four-team tournament between the top teams from the 2022 Copa América de Futsal and UEFA Futsal Euro 2022, taking place in Buenos Aires, Argentina, between 15 and 18 September 2022.

Teams
The two-best teams from each confederation qualified for the tournament. However, as all Russian teams were suspended from international competition by FIFA and UEFA due to the Russian invasion of Ukraine, UEFA Futsal Euro 2022 runners-up Russia were not eligible to compete, and third-placed Spain instead were selected for the tournament.

Venue
The tournament was held at the Estadio Mary Terán de Weiss in Buenos Aires. The , also located in Buenos Aires, was originally announced as the venue for the tournament on 2 June 2022. However, the venue was switched on 30 August 2022.

Matches
The tournament featured two semi-finals, a third place play-off and a final. The semi-final fixtures were determined based on the teams' performance in their continental tournament, with the champion of each confederation facing the non-champion of the other confederation.

All times are local, ART (UTC−3).

Bracket

Semi-finals

Third place play-off

Final

Goalscorers

References

External links
 
 

2022
Futsal Championship
Futsal Championship
International sports competitions in Buenos Aires
2020s in Buenos Aires
September 2022 sports events in Argentina
International futsal competitions hosted by Argentina
2022